|}

The Huxley Stakes is a Group 2 flat horse race in Great Britain open to horses aged four years or older. It is run over a distance of 1 mile, 2 furlongs and 70 yards at Chester in May.

History
The event is named after Huxley, a village located to the east of Chester. It was established in 1999, and the first running was won by Chester House. It initially held Listed status, and was promoted to Group 3 level in 2005. It was upgraded again to Group 2 level in 2018.

The trophy for the Huxley Stakes is known as the Tradesman's Cup. Another race at the venue, the Chester Cup, was originally called the Tradesmen's Cup.

Records

Most successful horse (3 wins):
 Maraahel – 2005, 2006, 2007

Leading jockey (7 wins):
 Ryan Moore - Doctor Fremantle (2009), Await The Dawn (2011), Marcret (2012), Cannock Chase (2016), Deauville (2017), Armory (2021), Solid Stone (2022)

Leading trainer (7 wins):
 Sir Michael Stoute – Adilabad (2001), Maraahel (2005, 2006, 2007), Doctor Fremantle (2009), Cannock Chase (2016), Solid Stone (2022)

Leading owner (4 wins):
 Hamdan Al Maktoum - Bandari (2004), Maraahel (2005, 2006, 2007)

Winners

See also
 Horse racing in Great Britain
 List of British flat horse races

References

 Racing Post: 

External links
 galopp-sieger.de – Huxley Stakes.
 ifhaonline.org – International Federation of Horseracing Authorities – Huxley Stakes (2019).
 pedigreequery.com – Huxley Stakes – Chester.

Open middle distance horse races
Chester Racecourse
Flat races in Great Britain
1999 establishments in England
Recurring sporting events established in 1999